Drouin is a surname. Notable people with the surname include:
 André Drouin (c. 1947 – 2017), Canadian politician
 Claude Drouin (born 1956), Canadian politician
 Derek Drouin (born 1990), Canadian high jumper
 Francis Drouin (born 1983), Canadian Liberal politician, Member of the Canadian House of Commons (from 2015)
 Henri Drouin (1911–1992), Canadian lawyer, Politician, and judge
 Jacques Drouin (born 1943), Canadian animator
 Jonathan Drouin (born 1995), Canadian ice Hockey player
 Jude Drouin (born 1948), Canadian ice hockey player
 Marie-Josée Drouin (born 1949), Canadian economist
 Mark Robert Drouin (1903–1963), Canadian politician
 Michelle Drouin (born 1974), American psychologist
 Noël Drouin (1912–2001), Progressive Conservative party member of the Canadian House of Commons
 Olivier-Napoléon Drouin (1867–1943), Canadian politician, mayor of Quebec City from 1910 to 1916
 Oscar Drouin (1890–1953), Canadian politician
 P. C. Drouin (born 1974), Canadian ice hockey player for the Fort Wayne Komets
 Paweensuda Drouin (born 1993), Thai television host, DJ, and beauty pageant titleholder
 Polly Drouin (1908–1968), Canadian ice hockey player
 René Drouin, president and chief executive of the New Hampshire Higher Education Assistance Foundation Network
 Richard Drouin (born 1932), Canadian lawyer and businessman
 Stéphen Drouin (born 1984), French footballer
 Vincent Drouin (born 1932), Liberal party member of the Canadian House of Commons
 Jeff Deslauriers (Jeff Drouin-Deslauriers; born 1984), Canadian ice hockey goaltender

See also
 Drouin, Victoria, Australia